Guillaume Levasseur de Beauplan (c. 1600 – 6 December 1673) or William le Vasseur de Beauplan was a French-Polish cartographer, engineer and architect.

Beauplan served as artillery captain for the army of the Crown of the Kingdom of Poland between 1630 and 1647 or 1648. He was sent to Ukraine where he served under Stanisław Koniecpolski in 1637–38. He used his architectural skills while in the military. In 1639, he was involved in the rebuilding of the Kodak Fortress. He also built a fortress at Bar, worked on Brody Castle, and structures in Kremenchuk.

In 1639, Beauplan created the first "descriptive" map of Ukraine. He created a map of Ukraine in 1648 that had detailed border information. By 1654 he was working in Danzig. He created a map with a scale of 1:452,000 and an additional map scaled at 1:1,800,000. Both maps were engraved by Willem Hondius. These maps would go on to be published in Rouen, France and reproduced by Veniiamyn Kordt. Beauplan published another map of the Dnieper River in 1662.

He wrote Description des contrés du Royaume de Pologne, which was published in 1651. It was renamed Description d'Ukranie, when the second edition was released in 1651. Two more editions were published in 1660 and 1861. The book was the first book published that provided a geographical, economic, and demographic description of Ukraine. By 1832 it had been translated into five languages. It remains in print today. In the book, Ukraine was described as a territory between Muscovy and Transylvania.

Publications 
, Internet Archive

References

External links 
 
 Dennis F. Essar, Andrew B. Pernal: Beauplan’s Description d’Ukranie. A Bibliography of Editions and Translations. Harvard Ukrainian Studies VI, 4 (1982), S. 485–499 (PDF).
Guillaume Le Vasseur de Beauplan at WorldCat
 Beauplan's bio at the website of French Ambassador to Ukraine

Year of birth unknown
1673 deaths
People from Dieppe, Seine-Maritime
17th-century French architects
French military engineers
17th-century engineers
17th-century cartographers
French cartographers
Emigrants from France to the Polish–Lithuanian Commonwealth
Military personnel of the Polish–Lithuanian Commonwealth
1600s births
Articles containing video clips